Markize is a French-Russian rock band founded in 2003 by the singer-songwriter Alina Dunaevskaya and drummer David Verbecq.

History

In September 2010, Tarja Turunen chose Markize to play with her on the most beautiful scenes of Europe. The band followed Tarja as her main support in Poland, Russia, Ukraine, Czech Republic, Netherlands, United Kingdom, Finland, France, Switzerland, Germany and Belgium.

Line-up 

 Alina Dunaevskaya : Vocals, keyboards
 David Verbecq : Drums
 Franck Chentrier : Guitars
 Julien De Feyssal : Bass

Discography

Albums
Poussières de Vie (2004)
Transparence (2007)
Transparence (Re-release) (2009)
A Perfect Lie (2012)

Videos
"Mon Ange" 
"In My Dream" (Live Acoustic TV)
"Transparence" (Live Acoustic TV)
"Poussières de Vie" (Live Acoustic TV)
"Mechanical Hearts" (2012)

External links
 Markize.com - Official website

References

French gothic metal musical groups
Alternative metal musical groups
Musical groups established in 2003
Musical quartets
Musical groups from Paris